Coforge, formerly known as NIIT Technologies, is an Indian multinational information technology company based in Noida, India and New Jersey, United States. The company's stock trades on the Bombay Stock Exchange and on the National Stock Exchange of India under the ticker symbol COFORGE.

History
The company was founded in 1981 named NIIT Ltd. In 2006, the company acquired UK Insurance Solutions Company. In the same year company partnered with Adecco SA.

In 2008, the company signed a multi million pounds deal with British Airways.

In 2012, the company implemented "Intranet Prahari" project for Border Security Force approved by Government of India. In the same year Indian Tobacco Board Government of Andhra Pradesh joined hands with the company to implementation of e-auction system in Karnataka and Andhra Pradesh.

In September 2012, the company launched Crew Wings, an application for Airline Cabin Crew Members.

In the same year company acquired Sabre Philippines Development Center.

In 2018, the Company acquired controlling interest in RuleTek, a US-based BPM architecture services company. After the acquisition, Coforge's digital arm Incessant Technologies control 55% of Ruletek.

In 2020, NIIT Technologies was re-branded as Coforge.

In April 2021, Coforge acquired 60% stake in SLK Global Solutions for 918 crore. After this acquisition, the company's employee count rose to 21,000 having inherited SLK's employee strength of 10,000.

CSR
Coforge has collaborated with NIIT Foundation and launched a CSR initiative, "Shiksha." Coforge has four operational centers impacting the lives of over 5000 underprivileged youth every year by providing various IT Skills and Employability Training. The organization has put its efforts to combat Climate Change by sponsoring the restoration of Neknampur Lake, a 98 acres lake situated in Telangana state.

References

External links

Indian companies established in 1981
Information technology companies of India
Technology companies established in 1981
Companies based in Princeton, New Jersey
Companies listed on the National Stock Exchange of India
Companies listed on the Bombay Stock Exchange